The 1937 Washington State Cougars football team was an American football team that represented Washington State College in the Pacific Coast Conference (PCC) during the 1937 college football season. Twelfth-year head coach Babe Hollingbery led the team to a 3–3–2 mark in the PCC and 3–3–3 overall.

The Cougars' four home games were played on campus at Rogers Field in Pullman.

Schedule

References

External links
 Game program: Idaho at WSC – October 2, 1937
 Game program: Washington at WSC – October 16, 1937
 Game program: USC at WSC – October 30, 1937

Washington State
Washington State Cougars football seasons
Washington State Cougars football